Haruni (also Romanized as Hārūnī; also known as Horūnī) is a village in Esfandar Rural District, Bahman District, Abarkuh County, Yazd Province, Iran. At the 2006 census, its population was 469, in 129 families.

References 

Populated places in Abarkuh County